This page provides the summary of RBBC1 USA Qualifier.

In 2007 and 2011, Red Bull BC One held a qualifier for the World Final in USA. The winner advances to the Red Bull BC One World Final.

Winners

Starting in 2012, Red Bull BC One USA Qualifier was replaced by RBBC1 North American Finals to include boys from Canada as well.

2011

RBBC1 USA Qualifier 2011 results 
Location: Chicago, United States

External links
 Red Bull BC One USA Qualifier 2011
 Red Bull BC One USA Qualifier 2007

Red Bull BC One